Jake's Grill is a restaurant in Portland, Oregon.

Description
Jake's Grill is a steakhouse in downtown Portland's Seward Hotel. The menu features steak and seafood, including cedar plank salmon. Surf and turf and happy hour are also offered. The restaurant's interior features dark woodwork and stuffed animal heads.

Jake's Grill has been described as a "sibling" restaurant to Jake's Famous Crawfish.

History
The restaurant opened in 1994. In 2014, a man sued the restaurant after being diagnosed with food poisoning.

Reception
In 2021, Eater Portland Jenni Moore and Krista Garcia included Jake's Grill in the lists "12 Stellar Portland Seafood Restaurants" and "Nine Steakhouses to Try in Portland and Beyond", respectively.

References

External links

 
 

1994 establishments in Oregon
Restaurants established in 1994
Southwest Portland, Oregon
Steakhouses in Portland, Oregon